The 2011 European Grand Prix (officially the 2011 Formula 1 Grand Prix of Europe) was a Formula One motor race held on 26 June 2011 at the Valencia Street Circuit in Valencia, Spain. The race, which was the eighth round of the 2011 Formula One season, was won by defending world drivers' champion and championship leader Sebastian Vettel, who was driving a Red Bull Racing car. Vettel, who started from pole position, also recorded the fastest lap of the race on lap 53, giving him a hat-trick. After a race-long battle, Ferrari driver Fernando Alonso and Vettel's teammate Mark Webber finished the race in second and third respectively. The race was notable for having the fewest retirements and the most finishers ever in a Formula One Grand Prix.

As a consequence of the race, Vettel extended his lead in the Drivers' Championship standings to 77 points over Jenson Button and Webber. By finishing first and third, Red Bull extended their Constructors' Championship standings lead to 89 points over nearest rivals McLaren.

Report

Background
The plan for a secondary DRS zone would be continued at the European Grand Prix, with the first zone incorporating the long back straight on the approach to Turn 12, and the second zone using the stretch from Turns 14 to 17. Future use of a second DRS zone would depend on its success in Montreal and Valencia.

While the planned date for the ban was kept in effect, extra limitations were introduced for the race in Valencia. This ban prohibits teams from running "extreme" engine maps in qualifying before reverting to a "safer" map for the race. The ban effectively means that teams are forced to run the same engine maps in both qualifying and the race.

The European Grand Prix also marked the race debut of Formula One tyre supplier Pirelli's medium-specification tyre compound. The medium compound tyre was selected as the white-banded harder "prime" tyre and the yellow-banded soft compound as the softer "option" compound.

This race was scheduled to be the last where off-throttle blown-diffusers were used; however the ban did not continue after the British Grand Prix and proved to be temporary. In Germany all the teams returned to use what was commonly referred to as Valencia specification, or Valencia-spec diffusers. The concept was eventually banned for 2012.

In Canada, Sebastian Vettel had lengthened his Drivers' Championship lead to 60 points. He had 161 points, and nearest title contenders Jenson Button, winner of the last Grand Prix, Red Bull Racing teammate Mark Webber and the second McLaren of Lewis Hamilton had 101, 94 and 85 respectively in second, third and fourth positions. Fernando Alonso's Ferrari had crashed out in Montreal, likewise Hamilton, and stayed on 69 points in fifth. Red Bull led the Constructors' table with 255 points, McLaren were in second with 186 and Ferrari were in third with 101. Renault were fourth with 60 and Mercedes were fifth with 52.

Practice
In the first free practice session, Mark Webber was the fastest car on track by eight-tenths of a second ahead of Renault's Vitaly Petrov, Fernando Alonso, and Lewis Hamilton for McLaren made it four different cars in the top four. Nick Heidfeld, in the second Renault, completed the top five, ahead of Felipe Massa and Jenson Button. Championship leader Sebastian Vettel was down in sixteenth place, two and half seconds off the pace of Webber. Karun Chandhok, who filled in for Jarno Trulli at Lotus was the only of the 24 drivers not to set a time. Nico Hülkenberg filled in for Paul di Resta at Force India and Daniel Ricciardo took Narain Karthikeyan's seat at HRT.

Alonso was the fastest man in the second session, once again narrowly followed by Hamilton. Vettel had moved himself up into third for this session, and fellow German, Michael Schumacher, was fourth. The remaining Red Bull Racing, McLaren, Ferrari, Mercedes and the two Renaults completed the top ten places. Jaime Alguersuari was the only driver not to set a time in the session. Trulli, di Resta and Karthikeyan all returned to their seats for the session. In the sole Saturday session, Vettel set the quickest time ahead of Alonso, Massa, Webber, Button, Nico Rosberg, Hamilton, Schumacher, Petrov and then Heidfeld.

Qualifying
Sebastian Vettel took his seventh pole position from eight races in 2011, closely followed by Red Bull teammate, Mark Webber, who completed the front row. The second and third fastest qualifying teams followed – the McLarens of Lewis Hamilton (third) and Jenson Button (sixth) split by the two Ferraris of Fernando Alonso ahead of teammate Felipe Massa. The Mercedes cars were seventh and eighth with Nico Rosberg in front of Michael Schumacher. After that, the Renaults and Force Indias fought to make the top 10 – one of each going through – they were followed by a similar battle between the Saubers and Williams cars. Sébastien Buemi was the one Toro Rosso in Q2, ending up seventeenth, with teammate Jaime Alguersuari eighteenth. The back three rows on the grid were filled up by the new teams – Narain Karthikeyan qualifying last and almost a second behind Vitantonio Liuzzi.

Race

At the start Sebastian Vettel led easily from pole, with teammate Mark Webber behind. Felipe Massa had a good start from fifth, driving straight between and past Lewis Hamilton and Fernando Alonso at Turn 1; but because Massa looked down the outside of Webber at Turn 2, Alonso could cleverly get back in front of Massa on the inside of Turn 3. Bad starts from the McLarens meant Hamilton dropped from third to fifth, and Jenson Button dropped from sixth to seventh – behind Nico Rosberg. Button later retook sixth place from Rosberg a few laps later into Turn 2. Before the pit stops the order was now Vettel, Webber, Alonso, Massa, Hamilton, Button, Rosberg, Schumacher (the four fastest cars in the top eight spots).

It seemed like the Ferraris had made great improvements since Canada because their pace was at least equal to the McLarens, and significantly faster at some stages of the race. The McLarens had quiet races, Button stuck in sixth, while Hamilton used the undercut to get past Massa in the pit stops for fourth, where he would finish the race.

Fernando Alonso engaged in a race long battle with Mark Webber for second while Vettel stormed away into the distance. Early on in the race Alonso overtook Webber in the first DRS zone, on the inside of Turn 12. However, in the pit stops, great Red Bull Racing strategy got Webber back in front. Ferrari later used the pit stops to get Alonso back in front of Webber. A radio message to Webber, telling him to go slower due to gearbox troubles ensured Alonso's second place.

Michael Schumacher finished a disappointing 17th after a misjudgement from him, when he exited the pits, where he ploughed his front wing into the side of Vitaly Petrov's Renault. This meant he had to pit again the following lap demoting him to 17th, where he stayed on a circuit notoriously difficult to overtake on. Although, Schumacher admitted after the race that seventh and eighth was the maximum for the two Mercedes cars. Sergio Pérez did a respectable job of preserving his tyres so he only had to pit once, he finished eleventh after starting in sixteenth. His Sauber teammate, Kamui Kobayashi, finished in sixteenth place, the first time in  he did not finish in the top ten. For the second race in a row Jaime Alguersuari justified his position in Toro Rosso by finishing eighth from eighteenth on the grid. Another driver on a good race was Mark Webber, calling it his "best race this year", although he was still beaten by teammate Vettel, who took his sixth victory from eight races.

Post-race
After the race both McLaren drivers told the media that there was work to be done, particularly improvements in the aerodynamics of their car.

The European Grand Prix had the most classified finishers (24) beating the record set in the 2011 Chinese Grand Prix. The Grand Prix is notable as it was only the fourth World Championship Grand Prix where there were no retirements, the others being the 1961 Dutch Grand Prix (fifteen starters), the 2005 United States Grand Prix (six starters) and the 2005 Italian Grand Prix (twenty starters).

The track was criticised by former Formula One driver Martin Brundle after the race, claiming its nature makes it difficult for drivers to overtake making the race boring. Former Formula One commentator Murray Walker claimed "the race was the least eventful race of an action packed season".

Classification

Qualifying

Race

Championship standings after the race 

Drivers' Championship standings

Constructors' Championship standings

 Note: Only the top five positions are included for both sets of standings.

See also 
 2011 Valencia GP2 Series round
 2011 Valencia GP3 Series round

References

External links

European Grand Prix
European Grand Prix
European Grand Prix
European Grand Prix
21st century in Valencia